Juan Carlos de Aréizaga (born 17 January 1756; died 1816) was a Spanish general, who fought in the Peninsular War.

In 1808 he was a retired colonel, residing in Pamplona, where he made friends with a young Francisco Javier Mina. After the outbreak of the Peninsular War, he moved to Zaragoza, where he became a divisional commander under Joaquín Blake  (1809). He also took part in the battle of Alcañiz (May 1809).

On 19 November 1809 he took the command of the newly established "Army of La Mancha", including 50,000 men. At the command of this unit, he suffered a crushing defeat against the French at the battle of Ocana.

In late 1809, he was placed in charge of the defense of the Andalusian passes. Aréizaga, however, was not able to stop the French invasion, and most of his forces were disbanded at Jaén in January 1810. He was subsequently replaced by General Freire.

1756 births
1816 deaths
Spanish generals
Spanish commanders of the Napoleonic Wars